"Take Me Away" is a song by Canadian singer-songwriter Fefe Dobson from her eponymous debut studio album (2003). It was released to radio as the second single from the album on 18 August 2003, by Island Records. The song was written by Dobson and Jay Levine, whilst production was helmed by Levine and James Bryan McCollum. "Take Me Away" debuted at number 96 on the Billboard Hot 100 on November 15, 2003 and later peaked at 87.

Production
The song was written by Dobson and Jay Levine, whilst production was helmed by Levine and James Bryan McCollum. The song had added an alternative rock flavour with rebellious themes, Guitars and drums were also added.

Artwork
Dobson would later question the design of the "Take Me Away" single cover and its seeming intention to mask her mixed race, suggesting it might've been done "to not shock people" and possibly present her as a white woman (although she is half-Jamaican Canadian).

Critical reception
Chuck Taylor of Billboard called "Take Me Away" a "refreshing change of pace" in the pop music landscape and wrote that the song "rocks steady with a siren assault of hyper-hooky guitars."

Music video
The music video was directed by Michael Palmieri and produced by Mike O'Connor. It shows her performing the song in a concert style. There is also an official 'making of' video.

Accolades

Track listings and formats
 CD single
 "Take Me Away"  – 3:32
 "Bye Bye Boyfriend"  – 4:14

Credits and personnel
Credits and personnel are adapted from the Fefe Dobson album liner notes.
 Fefe Dobson – vocals, writer, vocal arrangements
 Jay Levine – writer, producer, instrumentation, orchestration, arrangements, vocal arrangements, digital editing, Pro Tools operation
 Dan Kanter – guitar
 James Bryan McCollum – guitar, producer, instrumentation, orchestration, arrangements, digital editing, Pro Tools operation
 Kirk Broadbridge – guitar
 Tom Lord-Alge – mixing
 James Murray – engineering, digital editing, Pro Tools operation
 Dave Schiffman – additional engineering
 Jennifer Klein – engineering assistant
 Steve Chahley – engineering assistant
 Nir Z – drums
 Colin Robinson – percussion
 Jack Dailey – bass

Charts

Release history

References 

Fefe Dobson songs
2003 singles
Songs written by Fefe Dobson
2003 songs
Island Records singles
Songs written by Jason Levine